Caldera is a district of the Esparza canton, in the Puntarenas province of Costa Rica.

History 
Caldera was created on 7 April 2014 by Ley 9235.

Geography 
Caldera has an area of  km² and an elevation of  metres.

Demographics 

For the 2011 census, Caldera had not been created, no census data is available until 2021.

Transportation

Road transportation 
The district is covered by the following road routes:
 National Route 23
 National Route 27
 National Route 622
 National Route 755

References 

Districts of Puntarenas Province
Populated places in Puntarenas Province